And Hope to Die is a 1972 French-Italian-Canadian crime-drama film directed by René Clément and starring Jean-Louis Trintignant, Aldo Ray and Robert Ryan. It is loosely based on the novel Black Friday by David Goodis.

Plot 
Blamed for the death of three gypsy children in a plane crash in France, Tony Cardot flees to Canada, pursued by gypsies intent on revenge. In Montreal he witnesses a shootout, takes care of a wounded man who soon dies, but not before giving Tony $15,000 and whispering the enigmatic words: "Toboggan committed suicide." Then Tony is assaulted by two thugs, Mattone and Paul, who can't find the cash on him and take him back to their hideout on an island. There he meets the group leader Charley who threatens to kill Tony if he doesn't reveal where the money is. Nevertheless, he lets Tony stay, and the two men proceed to play mind games with one another. In the meantime, Charley's girlfriend Sugar and Paul's sister Pepper are both vying for Tony's attention. Tony succeeds in convincing the group he is also a gangster, and they enlist him in their plan: to kidnap a crucial witness in a mafia trial. After the partial failure of the kidnapping and the dispersal of the gang, Tony and Charley hole up together in the gangsters hideout, waiting for the police.

Cast
 Jean-Louis Trintignant as Tony Cardot aka Froggy
 Robert Ryan as Charley Ellis
 Lea Massari as Sugar
 Aldo Ray as Mattone
 Jean Gaven as Rizzio
 Tisa Farrow as Pepper
 Nadine Nabokov as Majorette
 André Lawrence as Chef gitan
 Don Arres as Mastragos
 Aubert Pallascio as Renner (as Louis Aubert)
 Ellen Bahl as himself
 Béatrice Belthoise as himself
 Jean Coutu as Inspector
 Jean-Marie Lemieux as Lester
 Michel Maillot as Gypsy
 Robert Party as MacCarthy #1
 Mario Verdon as MacCarthy #2
 Daniel Breton as Paul

Background
Sébastien Japrisot was initially hired to adapt the novel Black Friday by David Goodis that was published in France in the Série Noire. In the process of writing the script, Japrisot increasingly deviated from the source novel, adding personal motifs like scenes in Marseille where he grew up. David Goodis’ name does not appear in the film credits. The script also borrows some elements, like gangsters hiding in a fishing cabin, from another David Goodis' novel Somebody's Done For. Japrisot's screenplay was published by Denoël to coincide with the release of the film in 1972, then republished by Gallimard in the "Folio" collection in 1986.

Versions
The original French version ran 140 minutes. An alternate English language version released to the US runs 99 minutes. The version released on DVD in 2013 by StudioCanal UK runs 127 minutes. The 2020 Kino Lorber Blu-ray runs 141 minutes.

Reception
With only 1,077,246 admissions in France, the film was far less successful than the previous Clément-Japrisot collaboration Rider on the Rain (4,763,822 admissions and the third most popular movie of the year.)

Upon release, the film received mostly negative reviews in the U.S. Vincent Canby included it among the Ten Worst Movies of 1972, and added "if you have to, break your leg to avoid seeing it." Tony Mastroianni called it "a pretentious melodrama that aspires to being more than melodrama and which ends up being a good deal less" and said the film lacked a script, "especially one with reasonably believable dialog." TV Guide was more positive, calling it "a moody, somewhat arty gangster film with an outstanding cast."

References

External links
 And Hope to Die at Rotten Tomatoes
 
 

1972 films
1970s thriller drama films
1970s heist films
French thriller drama films
French heist films
Italian thriller drama films
Italian heist films
Films based on American novels
Films directed by René Clément
Films produced by Serge Silberman
Films set in Canada
1970s French-language films
1970s Italian films
1970s French films